Giffords is an American advocacy and research organization focused on promoting gun control. The organization draws its name from of one of its co-founders, Gabby Giffords, a former Democratic member of the U.S. House of Representatives. Rep. Giffords was shot along with 18 others at a constituent meeting in Tucson in 2011. The organization has three parts: a 501(c)(4) lobbying arm, a 501(c)(3) research arm, and a super PAC. It was previously known in a different configuration as Americans for Responsible Solutions.

Mission 
Giffords has written that when she and her husband, Mark Kelly, launched the organization, they "wanted to prove that it's possible to stand up for the Second Amendment while also standing up for stronger gun laws that keep us safe." The mission of the organization is to shift American gun culture through information and challenge the injustice of special interests risking individual safety all while changing U.S. policies to support safer gun laws.

History 
The organization known as Giffords began as a nonprofit and super PAC Americans for Responsible Solutions (ARS) which Giffords launched with her husband, retired astronaut and U.S. Navy aviator (and future United States Senator) Mark Kelly in 2013 shortly after the Sandy Hook Elementary School shooting. In its first electoral cycle, Kelly said the organization aimed to devote as much money to support pro-gun control candidates as the NRA had spent in the 2012 election. In 2016, ARS merged with the Law Center to Prevent Gun Violence, adding legal expertise and state-level research on gun laws to its work. In 2017, the group changed its name from Americans for Responsible Solutions to Giffords.

Gun control advocacy 
Giffords works on a range of issues to curb gun violence including requiring criminal background checks for gun purchases, reducing gun trafficking, conducting gun violence research, and regulating semi-automatic assault weapons. Giffords has played a role in passing more than 200 new gun laws in 45 states and Washington, D.C.

Through the Giffords Law Center to Prevent Gun Violence, the organization releases an annual scorecard to consider the "relative strength or weakness" of gun laws in each state as well as the rate of gun deaths. The Giffords Law Center also files amicus curiae briefs and takes other legal action to protect, enforce and strengthen gun regulations.

Electoral activity

2014 election cycle 
Giffords supports candidates with gun control in their platforms through its super PAC. The PAC spent $8 million in the 2014 election cycle on independent expenditures for and against 20 candidates. The largest share of the group's spending was in the race for the House seat previously held by Gabrielle Giffords in Arizona's second district. The group supported the incumbent, Democrat and Giffords's former aide Ron Barber, against Republican Martha McSally. McSally narrowly won the seat. Overall during the 2014 election cycle, the PAC devoted $4.9 million to oppose Republican candidates, $2.4 million in support of Democratic candidates and $860,000 in support of Republican candidates.

2016 election cycle 
In 2016, Giffords spent more than $2 million supporting New Hampshire Democrat Maggie Hassan in her bid to unseat Republican Sen. Kelly Ayotte, who had voted against expanding background checks for gun purchases. Hassan won the seat. The PAC also endorsed Republicans including two senate candidates, Pat Toomey of Pennsylvania and Mark Kirk of Illinois. Giffords and Kelly wrote that Toomey and Kirk "broke from the gun lobby" to support a bill to close the gun-show loophole. They also supported the Democratic candidate in two Senate races as well as a handful of House contests. Overall, Giffords spent $2.7 million on political races in 2016.

2017 statewide races 
Giffords supported two gubernatorial candidates in 2017 who supported stronger gun laws. Ralph Northam in Virginia and Phil Murphy in New Jersey, both Democrats, won their races.

2018 election cycle 
In 2018, the PAC continued to endorse and support candidates on both sides of the aisle, including three Republican candidates they identified by focusing on legislation that broke with Republican orthodoxy on guns laws. The organization particularly faced criticism over its endorsement of incumbent Republican Leonard Lance in New Jersey's 7th District over Democratic challenger Tom Malinowski. It was noted that both Lance and Malinowski supported gun legislation favored by Giffords. In the 2018 election Malinowski unseated Lance as Democrats took back the majority in the House of Representatives.

As of June 2018, the group had raised nearly $13 million and had donated more than $177,000 directly to federal candidates. As part of its 2018 campaign work, Giffords worked with VoteVets to rally support for seven congressional candidates who support stronger gun laws. All seven are Democrats. The group also dedicated millions to successfully unseat four NRA-backed incumbent House members.

Commentators and editorial pages noted that work by Giffords and other gun violence prevention organizations had been a powerful element in the 2018 election cycle. The Washington Post editorial board cited the work of Giffords and wrote that the election marked a "shift in the politics of gun control; no longer is it a third rail to be avoided at all costs." NPR reported that 95 candidates endorsed by Giffords PAC won House seats. According to the AP VoteCast election day survey, 61% of voters said gun laws should be more strict.

Other work 
In addition to endorsing and supporting state and federal candidates and lobbying for stronger gun laws, Giffords and Kelly have spoken out about the need to intensify our response to outbursts of gun violence. Immediately following the 2017 mass shooting in Las Vegas, Ms. Giffords issued a statement that she was praying for her former colleagues in Congress to "find the courage it will take to make progress on the challenging issues of gun violence." In a press conference on the steps of the U.S. Congress, Kelly echoed the call for more action, saying, "All we're hearing is thoughts and prayers...Your thoughts and prayers aren't going to stop the next shooting."

The group has also participated in a range of state and national advocacy campaigns and events. In March 2018, when survivors of the mass shooting at Marjory Stoneman Douglas High School in Parkland, Florida organized the March for Our Lives, Giffords helped bring more than 200 people from Parkland to participate. The organization has helped link local and regional groups into a campaign to register voters in the hopes of removing NRA-backed lawmakers from office. Giffords has also brought together former military commanders and other veterans to urge political leaders to address America's 'gun violence crisis.'

See also
Giffords Law Center to Prevent Gun Violence

References

External links

Gun control advocacy groups in the United States
Gabby Giffords
501(c)(4) nonprofit organizations